Hansuli Banker Upakatha is a film by Tapan Sinha based on the novel by Tarashankar Bandopadhyay, in 1962. The film under the Jalan Productions starred Kali Bannerjee, Dilip Roy, Rabi Ghosh and others. Set in 1941, the movie explores life in rural Bengal, the realities of the Zamindari system that was responsible for much of the social inequalities in Bengal, as well as the changes in social perceptions with time.

Cast
 Kali Banerjee
 Sukhen Das
 Anubha Gupta
 Ranjana Bannerjee
 Dilip Roy
 Bireswar Sen

External links

References

1962 films
1962 drama films
Bengali-language Indian films
1960s Bengali-language films
Indian drama films
Films based on Indian novels
Films directed by Tapan Sinha
Films based on works by Tarasankar Bandyopadhyay